Salt reedgrass is a common name for several plants and may refer to:

Desmostachya bipinnata, native to northern Africa and Asia
Spartina cynosuroides, native to eastern North America